In Christianity, the Visitation is the visit of Mary, who was pregnant with Jesus, to Elizabeth, who was pregnant with John the Baptist, in the Gospel of Luke,  .

It is also the name of a Christian feast day commemorating this visit, celebrated on 31 May in the feast-celebrating branches of Western Christianity (most and mainstream calendars of Catholics and High Church Anglicans (or as 2 July in calendars of 1263–1969, retained in the modern calendar of some countries whose bishops' conferences wanted to retain this, notably Germany and Slovakia) and 30 March in Eastern Christianity.

The episode is one of the standard scenes shown in cycles of the Life of the Virgin in art, and sometimes in larger cycles of the Life of Christ in art.

Biblical narrative 

Mary visits her relative Elizabeth; they are both pregnant: Mary with Jesus, and Elizabeth with John the Baptist. Mary left Nazareth immediately after the Annunciation and went "into the hill country ... into a city of Judah" to attend to her cousin Elizabeth. There are several possibilities as to exactly which city this was, including Hebron, south of Jerusalem, and Ein Karem. Elizabeth was in the sixth month before Mary came. Mary stayed three months, and most scholars hold she stayed for the birth of John. Given the prevailing cultural traditions and needs for security, it is probable that Joseph accompanied Mary to Judah then returned to Nazareth, and came again after three months to take his wife home. The apparition of the angel, mentioned in Matthew 1:19–25, may have taken place then to end the tormenting doubts of Joseph regarding Mary's maternity.

In the Gospel of Luke, the author's accounts of the Annunciation and Visitation are constructed using eight points of literary parallelism to compare Mary to the Ark of the Covenant.

Some Catholic commentators have maintained that the purpose of this visit was to bring divine grace to both Elizabeth and her unborn child. Even though he was still in his mother's womb, John became aware of the presence of Christ, and leapt for joy as he was cleansed from original sin and filled with divine grace. Elizabeth also responded and recognised the presence of Jesus, and thus Mary exercised her function as mediatrix between God and man for the first time.

In response to Elizabeth, Mary proclaims the Magnificat (My soul doth magnify the Lord) .

The word "blessed" is rendered in Greek not by the word "makarios" but as "evlogimeni", which is the feminine second person singular, used only this once in the New Testament. Its masculine third person singular counterpart "evlogimenos" is used only for Jesus and only on this occasion and when he was welcomed into Jerusalem on Palm Sunday with: "Blessed is he who comes in the name of the Lord". The masculine/mixed gender third person plural "evlogimenoi" is used by Jesus only when referring to the righteous who are to be raised to life in the Last Judgement.

Feast

Western Christianity 

The theme of the Feast of the Visitation centers on Mary responding to the prompting of the Holy Spirit to set out on a mission of charity.

This feast is of medieval origin. In 1389 Pope Urban VI, hoping thereby to obtain an end to the Great Western Schism, inserted it at the urging of John of Jenstein, Archbishop of Prague, in the Roman Calendar, for celebration on 2 July. In the Tridentine Calendar, it was a Double.  When that Missal of Pope Pius V was replaced by that of Pope Clement VIII in 1604, the Visitation became a Double of the Second Class, or, as it would be called from 1960 by Pope John XXIII's reform, a Second-Class Feast. It continued to be assigned to 2 July, the day after the end of the octave following the birthday of John the Baptist, who was still in his mother's womb at the time of the Visitation. In addition to July 2, the Visitation was also traditionally celebrated on Ember Friday in Advent, providing the Gospel reading for that day.

The 1969 revision of the calendar moved it to 31 May, "between the Solemnity of the Annunciation of the Lord (25 March) and that of the Nativity of St. John the Baptist (24 June), so that it would harmonize better with the Gospel story."

The Catholic Church in Germany (together with the Lutheran church) has, with the consent of the Holy See, kept 2 July date as a national variation of the General Roman Calendar.  Similarly, the Catholic Church in Slovakia has also retained the original date, because of an important national pilgrimage to the Basilica of the Visitation in the town of Levoča that has been held in the first weekend of July since the 13th century. Traditionalist Catholics, who use a pre-1970 calendar, also observe 2 July. In some Anglican traditions it is merely a commemoration rather than a feast day. 

In the Catholic Church, the Visitation is the second Joyful Mystery of the Rosary.

Eastern Christianity 
The celebration of a feast day commemorating this event in the Eastern Orthodox Church is of relatively recent origin, dating only to the 19th century. The impetus to establish a feast day in the Eastern Orthodox liturgical calendar, and the composition of a service to be included in the Menaion, were the work of Archimandrite Antonin Kapustin (1817–1894), head of the Russian Orthodox Ecclesiastical Mission in Jerusalem. The Gorneye Convent in Jerusalem, which was built on the traditional site of the Meeting of the Theotokos (Virgin Mary) and St. Elizabeth, celebrates this Feast on 30 March. (Julian Calendar 30 March corresponds, until 2099, to Gregorian Calendar 12 April.) If 30 March falls between Lazarus Saturday and Pascha (Easter), the Visitation Feast is transferred to Bright Friday.  Celebration of the Feast of the Visitation has not yet been accepted by all Orthodox jurisdictions.

In Syriac Christianity the feast of the Visitation is celebrated on the third Sunday in the Season of Announcements prior to Christmas.

Commentary 

The visitation of Mary to Elizabeth in Luke 1:39—56 is seen by many as a rich source of commentary on the role of Mary in the Christian Church. Pointing to the veneration of the Mother of God in the Catholic church, German theologian Friedrich Justus Knecht (d. 1921), writes that "In the Magnificat Mary said prophetically: 'From henceforth all generations shall call me blessed.' This prophecy has been fulfilled in the Catholic Church, for our holy Church honours our Lady by special feasts and special devotions. How would it be possible not to pay honour to her whom God raised to such a high dignity, and praised in such a manner by the mouths of Gabriel and Elizabeth! Our veneration of the holy Mother of God is well founded both on Holy Scripture and on reason."

Knetch also notes that Mary gives us a pattern of charity, asking the questions, "Why did Mary hasten to visit her cousin? What were her reasons? " He answers by writing, "Firstly, the angel had referred her to Elizabeth, although she had believed his words without asking for a sign. She therefore believed it to be God’s will that she should visit her cousin, and convince herself of the truth of the sign given her, i. e. that Elizabeth was about to have a son. Secondly, Mary knew well that her cousin had grieved for many years on account of being childless, and she knew how happy she must be now that the cause of her grief was removed. Mary’s loving heart sympathised with the happiness of her cousin; she desired to wish her joy, rejoice with her, and join her in praising God’s mercy. He who really loves his neighbour has a loving sympathy with his joys and sorrows. Thirdly, Mary, as the holy Fathers teach, wished to minister to her cousin, and help her in her household affairs.

In Roger Baxter's meditations he compares the visitation to the ark of the Lord, writing: "Consider the inspired words of Scripture: 'The ark of the Lord abode in the house of Obededom, the Gethite, three months; and the Lord blessed Obededom and all his household.' (2 Kings vi. 11.) How much more may we suppose did He bless the house of Zachary, in which the living ark of the Lord and the mother of God dwelt so long."

See also 
 Churches of the Visitation
 Order of the Visitation of Holy Mary

References

External links 

 The Meeting of the Mother of God and Saint Elizabeth – Orthodox icon and synaxarion

1st-century BC Christianity
Catholic holy days
Eastern Orthodox liturgical days
Gospel of Luke
John the Baptist
Joyful Mysteries
March observances
Marian feast days
Mary, mother of Jesus
May observances